Mystic Story (formerly Mystic Entertainment, abbreviated as MSTSTR) is a South Korean entertainment company established by South Korean singer-songwriter Yoon Jong-shin. It has four subsidiaries, including Mystic Actors (formerly Family Actors Entertainment), which manages actors and actresses.

History
Mystic Story, originally Mystic Entertainment, comprises the merger of three entertainment companies. Mystic89 was founded by singer-songwriter Yoon Jong-shin and was known for housing indie artists rather than idol groups. In March 2014 it merged with Family Actors Entertainment, which managed mostly actors and actresses, to become Mystic89 & Family, with both companies maintaining their separate focus in music and acting respectively. In July 2014, Mystic89 merged with APOP Entertainment, which houses girl group Brown Eyed Girls. Family Actors later changed its name to Mystic Actors.

In February 2015, Mystic89 added veteran singer and actress Uhm Jung-hwa.

In March 2017, SM Entertainment acquired Mystic, becoming the label's largest shareholder.

On March 25, 2019, Mystic Entertainment changed their name to Mystic Story.

Subsidiaries

Mystic89 
Mystic89 is a music label under the leadership of the producer Yoon Jong Shin. As of 2013, MYSTIC89 has established itself as a professional and organized record company. MYSTIC89 is active not only on music industry but also on general mass culture industry including drama, entertainment program and movies.

APOP 
APOP is a music label which produces global contents on K-Pop, J-Pop and Asia Pop market.

Mystic Actors 
Mystic Actors is an actor management label established by Mystic Story.

All I Know Music 
All I Know Music is a music label headed by producer K JUN and established by Mystic Story to produces hip hop contents. Since 2019, the label was separated from Mystic Story upon its acquisition by SM Entertainment as its sublabel.

Artists

Mystic Story

Soloists
Yoon Jong-shin (founder/producer)
Hareem
Jo Jung-chi
Jung-in
Hong-ja
Jeong Jin-woon
Eddy Kim
Son Tae-jin
Jo Yeon-ho

Groups
Shinchireem
Lucy
Billlie

Entertainers
Kim Young-chul (2015–present)
Kim Jin-soo
Yang Je-woong
Kian84
Oh Young-joo

Apop 
Soloists
Gain
Miryo

Groups
Brown Eyed Girls

Studio Artists
Cho Young-chul (producer and CEO)
Lee Minsu (composer)
Kim Eana (lyricist)

Mystic Actors  
 Park Hyuk-kwon
 Kim Suk-hoon
 Park Sun-woo
 Lee Chang-hoon
 Ryohei Otani (2015–present)
 Jo Han-sun
 Jung Tae-woo
 Tae Hang-ho (2016–present)
 Lee Jung-hyuk
 Oh Dong-min
 Jang Won-hyung
 Shin Jae-hwi
 Lee Woo-tae
 Lee Chan-hyung (2019–present)
 Kim Kang-min
 Kim Jae-won (2021–present)
 Ha Jae-sook
 Oh Ji-eun (2013–present)
 Kim Sung-eun
 Jung Yu-mi  (2021–present)
 Noh Susanna
 Cha Min-jee
 Go Min-si
 Lee Ji-won
 Hwang Bo-reum-byeol
 Kim Si-a (2019–present)
 Seo Ji-soo (2022–present)

All I Know Music 
 K JUN (producer)
 Giant Pink
 Skooby Doo
 Bray
 Duckbae
 Sohlhee

Former Artists
Recording artists
Jang Jane (2013–2019)
Kim Yeon-woo (2013–2016)
Lim Kim (2011–2016)
Park Ji-yoon (2013–2016)
Muzie (2013–2017)
Thunder (2015–2018)
Puer Kim
Yoo Yong-min
Uhm Jung-hwa
Lee Hyun-kyung
Brown Eyed Girls
Narsha (2015–2018)
JeA (2015–2021)
Sandy (2019)
Parc Jae-jung (2015–2021)
Joe Won-sun
Miyu Takeuchi (2019–2021)
Park Sang-don
Seo Jang-hoon
Ji-sang
PERC%NT
Minseo

Actors/actresses
Son Eun-seo (2013–2014)
Shin So-yul (2013–2016)
 Lee Kyu-han 
 Ha Jae-sook
 Sora Jung 
 Ahn Min-ah
 Kim Ki-bang
 Kim Jung-hyun
 Jang So-yeon
 Lee Jiyoun
 Lee Joo-yeon (2018–2021)
 Han Chae-ah (2015-2020)
 Lee Ari
 Song Yoon-an
 Kang Rae-yeon
 Kim Min-jee
 Kim Sa-kwun
 Zang Wang-hyoung
 Yoo Ju-hye
 Jang Joon-yoo
 Park Si-yeon (2015–2022)

MCs
Park Ji-yoon (2013–2016)

Notes

Distribution partners
CJ E&M Music and Live
Kakao M

References

External links
 
 

South Korean companies established in 2001
Electronic dance music record labels
Hip hop record labels
Labels distributed by CJ E&M Music and Live
Labels distributed by Kakao M
Music companies of South Korea
K-pop record labels
Publishing companies established in 2001
Record labels established in 2001
SM Entertainment subsidiaries
Soul music record labels
South Korean record labels
Talent agencies of South Korea